Brezova is a village in the municipality of Ivanjica, Serbia. According to the 2011 census, the village has a population of 483 inhabitants.

Notable people
 Ljuba Čupa (1877–1913), guerrilla fighter
 Petar Stambolić (1912–2007), politician
 Ivan Stambolić (1936–2000), politician

References

Populated places in Moravica District